Parahypopta nigrosignata is a moth in the family Cossidae. It is found in Syria, Turkey, Jordan and Israel.

References

Natural History Museum Lepidoptera generic names catalog

Moths described in 1912
Cossinae
Taxa named by Walter Rothschild